Cryptops lamprethus is a species of centipede in the Cryptopidae family. It is endemic to New Zealand. It was first described in 1920 by American biologist Ralph Vary Chamberlin.

Distribution
The species occurs in the North Island. The type locality is Taumarunui in the Ruapehu District.

References

 

 
lamprethus
Centipedes of New Zealand
Animals described in 1920
Taxa named by Ralph Vary Chamberlin